Amanda Miguel (born 1 June 1956) is an Argentine singer.

Early life
Miguel was born in Gaiman, in the Chubut Province in Argentina, June 1, 1956.

Career
At 17, she met Diego Verdaguer, a man five years her senior, whom she would later marry.  At this time, Verdaguer was already an established artist, and she joined his musical group called Mediterráneo. The group enjoyed success in Los Angeles, California, but after being discovered by a Univision network record executive, she launched her own solo career with help from San Diego.  

Miguel's first album, El Sonido Vol. 1, was recorded in 1981, and released a year later.  Implementing a different sound and style than Mediterráneo, her album was a success. Follow-up albums were released a year later. Songs during this period, such as Asi No Te Amara Jamas, Él Me Mintió (1981), and Mi Buen Corazón (1982) have become staples of Los Angeles radio stations for KRCD-FM Recuerdo 103.9/98.3 FM.

The birth of their daughter, Ana Victoria, led Miguel to break from the recording studio and focus on motherhood. 

She would return to the music scene in 1987, with her fourth album, El Pecado.  In 1989 she recorded her fifth studio album, El rostro del Amor, with lyrics by Anahi van Zandweghe.  Its title song was chosen to greet Pope John Paul II in his visit to Mexico. 

For her sixth album, Rompecorazones, she delved in the world of ranchero music.  Under the supervision of composer Federico Mendez, he chose her songs, including the title song, which became great hits. 

In 1996, Miguel traveled to Italy where she recorded Amame una vez más, also with lyrics by Anahi in the title song and most of the others. The album was released the same year and was met with critical praise and highly positive sales in the United States and Latin America. The title track was nominated for a Lo Nuestro Award for Pop Song of the Year.

She returned in 1998 to record once more.  The album 5 Dias was released the following year.  It included a remake of the song "Así Como Hoy", which Diego produced.  

In 2005, she released her album Piedra de Afilar. This album brought in newcomer, multi-instrumentalist David Snow as a co-producer with her longtime husband/producer Diego Verdaguer. This album shows Amanda to be looking ahead to a more modern sound without losing the polished productions and fabulous songs that made her famous. This album also contains a long-awaited duet between Miguel and Diego, "Siempre Fuimos Dos", penned by David Snow, Diego Verdaguer and Miguel, with lyrics by Anahi, who also wrote all the other lyrics in the album.

Personal life
Amanda was married to Diego Verdaguer, another Argentine-Mexican singer, until his death January 28, 2022. They were living in Los Angeles at the time of his death.

Studio albums
1981 - El Sonido Volumen I
1983 - El Sonido Volumen II
1984 - El Ultimo Sonido Volumen III
1987 - El Pecado
1989 - El Rostro Del Amor
1992 - Rompecorazones
1996 - Amame Una Vez Mas
1999 - 5 Dias
2004 - Feliz Navidad A Toda La Humanidad
2005 - Serie Plantino 20 Exitos de Amanda Miguel
2006 - Piedra de Afilar
2006 - El Rostro del Amor (CD + DVD) [Re-Edicion]
2007 - Latin Classics Amanda Miguel
2007 - Piedra de Afilar (CD + Multimedia) [Re-Edicion]
2008 - Anillo de Compromiso
2011 - El Sonido Volumen I (2011 Remasterizado)
2013 - El Sonido Volumen II (2013 Remasterizado) 
2014 - El Ultimo Sonido Volumen III (2014 Remasterizado) 
2015 - 80*15

Compilations and singles
1980 - Papa, Cuando Regreses - "Tengo que confesar que lo amaba" (Single)
1981 - Así No Te Amará Jamás - Quiero Un Amor Total 
1981 - Él Me Mintió - Amanda Al Piano 
1982 - Mi Buen Corazón - Hagamos Un Trato
1982 - ¿Quien Será? - Siempre Te Amare
1983 - Castillos - Un Día De Estos
1983 - Como Un Títere - Poquito A Poco
1983 - Cosquillas En El Pecho - Igual Que Un Avión 
1984 - El Gato Y Yo - ¿A Donde Va?
1987 - ¿Qué Me Das? (Single)
1988 - Ojos De Alquitran (Maxi Single)
1994 - 16 Kilates (Compilation)
1996 - 20  Exitos (Compilation)
1997 - Exitos (Compilation)
1999 - Serie Millennium 21 (Compilation)
2000 - 15 Kilates (Compilation)
2005 - Serie Plantino 20 Exitos de Amanda Miguel
2005 - Siempre Fuimos Dos - En  vivo  UN  SHOW  UNICO - CD + DVD (Compilation with Diego Verdaguer)
2007 - Latin Classics Ananda Miguel
2008 - En  concierto- (compilation  with  Diego  Verdaguer)
2015 - Vaya Pedazo De Rey

References

External links
 Amanda Miguel's official website
 Amanda Miguel's biography online at SACM (Sociedad de Autores y Compositores de Musica)
 
 

1956 births
Argentine emigrants to Mexico
Mexican women singers
Naturalized citizens of Mexico
People from Chubut Province
Living people
Women in Latin music
Latin Grammy Lifetime Achievement Award winners